The repopulation of wolves in California was recognized in late December 2011, when OR-7, a male gray wolf from Oregon, became the first confirmed wild wolf in California since 1924, when wolves were considered extirpated from the state. The first resident wolf pack was confirmed in 2015, after two adults migrated from Oregon and had five pups. Additional wolves have been tracked during their natural expansion into state, as the Cascade Range, which wolves have repopulated in Oregon, extends south into northern California. In 2021, the state had at least two wolf packs with pups for the first time in over a hundred years. It is likely that other uncollared wolves are dispersing through portions of their historic habitat in California.

Precursors in Oregon 
Wolves in the United States were protected under the federal Endangered Species Act in 1978 as they were in danger of going extinct and needed protection to aid their recovery. Wolves were reintroduced to Idaho in the 1990s and expanded their range into the northern Rocky Mountains and Pacific Northwest. Wolves crossed the Snake River from Idaho to Oregon by swimming or finding a bridge. The Oregon Department of Fish and Wildlife started studying their behavior in the wild by live-trapping the growing wolf population in Oregon and fitting them with GPS tracking collars that provide daily satellite position reports. State biologists gave a sequential designation to each wolf with a collar. The vast majority remain clustered in their historic range in the northeast corner of the state, where the forests between the high mountains and populated areas are full of elk and deer. In 2010, state biologists noticed wolves in the Cascade Range but were unable to determine if they were single dispersing animals wandering through or were starting to occupy the area. Individual wolves will roam, searching for a mate and new territory. As the California Department of Fish and Wildlife (CDFW) monitored the expansion of wolves in Oregon, they began in 2011 to prepare for the possibility of wolves recolonizing the state. While the state did not have a program to reintroduce wolves, the assumption was that the natural expansion would eventually have wolves crossing the Oregon/California border. With its dense forests, plentiful deer and other prey, and vast expanses of wilderness where roads don't pose a fatal threat, California has areas of excellent habitat for wolves.

Initial entry and reactions 

OR-7 was the first confirmed wild wolf in California since 1924. In late December 2011, the data sent by his GPS tracking collar showed he had crossed the Oregon/California border. Nicknamed Journey, he was a male gray wolf that migrated from the Wallowa Mountains in northeastern corner of Oregon. After leaving his pack, he wandered generally southwest for more than  through Oregon, and entered northern California. He spent much of 2012 exploring northeastern California in a circuitous path across seven different counties that eventually covered thousands of miles. In March 2013, he returned to Oregon and was found in 2014 raising a litter of pups in Rogue River–Siskiyou National Forest. Being so near to the California border, he crossed back and forth repeatedly. He is presumed to have died at about 11 years old, an above-average lifespan for a wild wolf.

Under the state's Endangered Species Act, the California Fish and Game Commission granted the gray wolf protection in 2014. The Department (CDFW) had recommended against the inclusion as a wolf management plan being developed would protect the animals. The management plan would attempt to balance the needs of wildlife with the needs of people using the best available science. The plan could allow flexibility for ranchers concerned about attacks on livestock and deal with concerns that wolves might decimate elk herds. In 2016, the department completed the plan and published the Conservation Plan for Gray Wolves in California. The management plan provides policy for wildlife managers as they handle potential conflicts between the wolves, humans, and livestock. To balance ample prey for wolves with opportunities for hunters, the plan included management of deer, elk, and other game animals. The plan also covers the impact that wolves as predators may have on other species of concern. A judge found in 2019 that wolves wandering in naturally from neighboring states should be protected by California's laws after a lawsuit was brought by the Pacific Legal Foundation, the California Farm Bureau Federation and the California Cattlemen's Association challenging the listing. By 2019, 15 wolves in three different groups had become established in the Cascade Range of Oregon. Northern California is easily accessible as the Cascades extend southerly into the state. Wolves leave a scent trail that they can use to communicate and retrace their wanderings. Wildlife experts explain that it is possible for other wolves to follow said urine scent and these initial wolf sojourns can open up new territory. In 2019, California Fish and Game Commission opposed the federal proposal to delist wolves from the Endangered Species Act. They argued that federal protection was still needed to make a full recovery since the future wolf population in California will depend on expanding from other states. In November 2021, a federal judge held a hearing on a particular issue, Were wolves properly classified under the endangered act prior to losing their protected status last year?

First resident packs 
The Shasta Pack was the first resident pack in more than a century, due to the presence of five pups in 2015. Living in Siskiyou County, just south of the Oregon–California border, the pack's breeding pair came from the same pack as OR-7, making them his siblings. Officials with CDFW said they believe the two adult wolves migrated into the state from southern Oregon when the department released a photo taken by a trail camera in 2015. One of the grown-up pups was found in northwestern Nevada in 2016, the first wolf verified in Nevada in nearly 100 years. They were involved in what was possibly the first modern predation in California when they may have killed a calf they ate in November 2015. Wolves are typically scavengers so it is common for a cow to die of disease and then the wolves come in. Ranchers would like the right to protect their livestock but penalties will be imposed for the killing, shooting, injuring, or taking of wolves in California. The pack disappeared under unexplained circumstances.

The Lassen Pack, living in Lassen National Forest were confirmed in the fall of 2016. The first breeding male of the Lassen Pack was CA-08M, son of OR-7. In June 2017, CDFW biologists fitted the pack's breeding female, known as LAS01F, with a tracking collar. She is not related to known Oregon wolves, and genetic analysis indicates that she likely dispersed from some other part of the northern Rocky Mountain wolf population. Born in 2014, possibly in Wyoming where she has half-siblings, she traveled  or more through the Great Basin Desert in Utah and Nevada, or a much longer journey through Idaho and Oregon. The CDFW and the U.S. Forest Service traced the four pups from this second pack in 2017 to OR-7. The pair went on to have five pups in 2018, and four pups in 2019. CA-08M had not been detected with the pack since spring 2019. A black-colored adult male is the new breeding male, LAS16M, who began traveling with the pack as early as June 2019. The pack had two litters of four pups each in 2020 with LAS09F, a two-year-old female, also giving birth. LAS09F had six pups in 2021 but LAS01F had not been detected since fall 2020. Most of the Lassen Pack's activity has been tracked across the western parts of Lassen County, and the northernmost part of Plumas County. LAS13M (collared), a young male wolf from the pack, journeyed to Lake County, Oregon, in early October 2020. The Lassen Pack survived the Dixie Fire when it burn through their home range in August 2021.

OR-85, a two-year-old male wolf, left the Mt. Emily Pack in Oregon and traveled to Siskiyou County in November 2020. In January 2021, another wolf (which biologists believed to be a female) joined OR-85 in the northernmost part of California.  Named the Whaleback Pack, the female is related to Oregon's Rogue Pack. In September 2021, CDFW wolf specialist Kent Laudon confirmed the Whaleback Pack had 7 pups.  With both the Whaleback and Lassen packs having pups in 2021, the state had at least two wolf packs with pups for the first time in over a hundred years. In the spring of 2022, the Whaleback Pack had eight pups, all of which survived into the fall. The Lassen Pack had 5 pups in 2022.

Further exploration and challenges 
OR-93 was the 16th documented gray wolf in the recent history of the state. The two-year-old male wolf was fitted with a purple radio collar in June 2020 by tribal biologists on the Warm Springs Indian Reservation in the northern Cascade Mountains in Oregon. After leaving his White River pack, he reached Mono County, east of Yosemite National Park in the central Sierra Nevada in February 2021, which is the farthest south a wolf has been tracked in California in more than a century. Heading west, he crossed the agricultural area of the Central Valley near Fresno. After being tracked through 16 California counties, the signal was lost in San Luis Obispo County. While avoiding populated areas, the wolf had crossed three major north–south highways; California Route 99, Interstate 5, and Highway 101 along the way. OR-93 may have been spotted on May 15 in southwestern Kern County in a videotape of a wolf at a water trough on private property. September wolf sightings in rural northern Ventura County were confirmed by CDFW through the identification of recent wolf tracks. Due to the purple collar, the animal is assumed to be OR-93. This is the farthest south in California that a gray wolf has been documented since one was captured in San Bernardino County in 1922. He was found dead in November, apparently killed by a vehicle on a highway. A truck driver notified authorities after he noticed a dead wolf along a dirt trail in Kern County off Interstate 5 near the town of Lebec. It is likely several other undetected wolves are dispersing through portions of their historic habitat in the state.

In May 2021, a confirmed wolf depredation occurred in Eastern Plumas County. Evidence of 3 wolves were seen at the carcass and the wolves were named the Beckwourth Pack. Preliminary DNA analysis indicates one of the wolves in the Beckwourth Pack is LAS12F, a female from the Lassen Packs 2019 litter. Origins of the other 2 wolves are unknown but field efforts are ongoing. Also in May, OR-103, a young male who was outfitted with a GPS collar in Deschutes County, Oregon, crossed the border into Siskiyou County. OR-103 developed a crippled front paw, and has no way to catch quick, preferred prey such as deer and elk.

See also 
 List of gray wolf populations by country
 History of wolves in Yellowstone
 Repopulation of wolves in Colorado
 Repopulation of wolves in Midwestern United States

References

Citations

Bibliography

External links 
 Gray Wolf, California Department of Fish and Wildlife, Conservation:Mammals
 Gray wolf (Canis lupus), ECOS - U.S. Fish and Wildlife Service

California
Wolves
Wolves
Wolves
Wolves
Wolves